Warren is an unincorporated community and coal town in Knox County, Kentucky, United States. It was also known as Cumberland Station.

References

Unincorporated communities in Knox County, Kentucky
Unincorporated communities in Kentucky
Coal towns in Kentucky